Catherine Gentile is an American short story writer.

Life
She is a native of Hartford, Connecticut. 
She graduated from Saint Joseph College (Connecticut) with a master's degree. 
After a career in special education/mental health, she turned to writing.

Her short fiction has been published in The Hurricane Review, The Ledge, The Long Story, and Kaleidoscope.

She is a staff writer for Portland Trails.  She lives with her husband near Yarmouth, Maine, where she is completing her first novel, Sunday's Orphan.

Awards
 2005 Dana Award
 Summer Literary Seminars in St. Petersburg, Russia fellowship
 The Reynolds Price Fiction Contest finalist

Works

Anthologies

References

Living people
Writers from Hartford, Connecticut
American short story writers
University of Saint Joseph (Connecticut) alumni
Year of birth missing (living people)